Adams Lake is a lake in the U.S. state of Wisconsin.

Adams Lake most likely is named after J. C. Adams, who owned land adjacent to the lake. A variant name is "Second Lake".

References

Lakes of Wisconsin
Bodies of water of Portage County, Wisconsin